Good 'n' Groovy is an album by trumpeter Joe Newman with saxophonist Frank Foster recorded in 1961 and originally released on the Swingville label.

Reception

AllMusic awarded the album 4 stars stating "This was the second of Joe Newman's three dates he led under the Swingville banner".

Track listing
All compositions by Joe Newman except as indicated
 "A.M. Romp" - 6:56
 "Li'l Darlin'" (Neal Hefti) - 5:39
 "Mo-Lasses" - 6:26
 "To Rigmor" - 5:15
 "Just Squeeze Me" (Duke Ellington, Lee Gaines) - 7:03
 "Loop-D-Loop" - 6:51

Personnel 
Joe Newman - trumpet
Frank Foster - tenor saxophone
Tommy Flanagan - piano
Eddie Jones - bass
Bill English - drums

References 

1961 albums
Joe Newman (trumpeter) albums
Swingville Records albums
Albums produced by Esmond Edwards
Albums recorded at Van Gelder Studio